Wuhan Metro is a rapid transit system serving the city of Wuhan, Hubei, China. With 1.22 billion annual passengers in 2019, Wuhan Metro is the sixth-busiest rapid transit system in mainland China. There are a number of lines or sections under construction. The government of Wuhan City promised the citizens that at least two lines or sections open every year.

Line 1, the first line in the system, opened on 28 July 2004, making Wuhan the seventh city in mainland China with a rapid transit system, after the cities of Beijing, Tianjin, Shanghai, Guangzhou, Changchun, and Dalian. Line 2 opened on 28 December 2012 and is the first underground rail line crossing the Yangtze River. The system has since undergone rapid expansion.

History

Preliminary studies of urban rail transit systems were prompted by the city shortly after a Belgian Railways delegation visit in 1984. Following the demolition of the old Beijing-Hankou Railway, the city of Wuhan planned to utilize the corridor to construct the city's first rapid transit rail line. In September 1992, the Wuhan Metro Construction Group was established by Wuhan Municipal Construction Commission and a supervision group, led by the mayor Qian Yunlu, was subsequently formed in 1993 to facilitate the project's funding, planning, logistics, and organization. It took seven years before the city was able to fund construction.

In October 1999, the National Planning Commission (predecessor of the National Development and Reform Commission) approved the Wuhan "Light Rail" project (Line 1, phase 1), signalling the start of serious work on the rail transit project. On October 2, 2000, the Wuhan Municipal Government ratified the establishment of Wuhan Rail Transit Co., Ltd., and contracted construction, operation, administration and related real estate development to the corporation.

In December 2000, the National Planning Commission accepted a feasibility report on the project and approved construction on phase 1 of Line 1. On December 23, 2000, the project broke ground and comprehensive construction began.

In 2002, with the anticipation of an economic boom and increasing demand for urban rail transit, Wuhan Municipal Government approved the city's first long-term rail transit master plan. On July 28, 2004, the ten-station long "light rail" line was opened to the public and entered revenue service in August. However, low ridership discouraged the city from funding the extension project, for which ground had been broken on December 15, 2005, and a 4-year delay in construction ensued. In April 2006, the NDRC ratified a six-year construction/operation plan, but it was not until a year later on April 9, 2007, that NDRC accepted the feasibility report for line 1, phase 2 (the extension project) and approved construction on the project.

In the interim, construction began on Fanhu station of the fully underground Line 2 on November 16, 2006, as a response to the six-year plan adopted by NDRC earlier. Construction also began on the underground line 4 stations of Wuchang railway station in June, and Wuhan railway station in September, as parts of the integral capital project to revamp and construct the Wuhan Railway Hub.

In May 2007, the Hubei Provincial Development and Reform Commission (HDRC) approved preliminary designs on Line 1, phase 2, and comprehensive construction subsequently commenced in June. On May 15, the city government approved the establishment of Wuhan Metro Group Co., Ltd., which would replace the Wuhan Rail Transit Co., Ltd and assume its responsibilities and benefits.

On September 12, 2007, the NDRC accepted the feasibility report to Line 2, phase 1, and preliminary designs were approved by the HDRC in December 2007. However, it was not until September 2008 that land purchases and funding were facilitated and comprehensive construction began to take place. In October 2009, drilling of the Yangtze River tunnel started.

On March 13, 2009, the NDRC accepted a feasibility report to Line 4, phase 1. On May 13, 2009, the HDRC ratified preliminary designs on Line 4, phase 1. Comprehensive construction ensued on the Wuchang segment of Line 4. A more ambitious urban rapid transit plan was submitted for NDRC review in October 2009, and in late November, on-site panel investigations were conducted by China International Engineering Consulting Corporation.

In February 2010, Wuhan Metro's first commercial property was topped out in Hanxi 1st Road station. On July 29, Line 1 phase 2 entered revenue service from Dijiao to Dongwu Boulevard. Despite plans to extend the westernmost terminus to Jinshan Avenue in Dongxihu District, the station was never built. A short stub with crossover tracks was constructed behind Dongwu Boulevard. Zhuyehai, a station in Qiaokou District, remained non-operational in spite of the existence of complete platforms. Neither exits nor staircases had been built yet. It was due to open when the Wuhan IKEA store was completed in late 2014.

A revised and more detailed construction plan was accepted by the NDRC on January 31, 2011. The plan specified the city's plan to complete construction on Line 3, 4, 6, 7, and 8 before 2017. Beginning on March 1, Line 1 subdivided its fare zones from 3 to 5 and lowered maximum fare per ride from 5 CNY to 4 CNY. Wuhan Tong cardholders will receive a 20 percent discount on single ride fares. On April 9, Line 1 welcomed its 100,000,000th customer, who was awarded a one-year pass to the Metro. On September 9, preliminary designs on Line 4, phase 2 (Hanyang segment) was approved by HDRC.

On February 17, 2012, the NDRC accepted a feasibility report on Line 3, phase 1, the fourth line in Wuhan Metro's grid and the first to cross the Han River, connecting the boroughs of Hankou and Hanyang. A feasibility report to Line 6—the second Hankou-Hanyang connection—was also approved by the NDRC on December 21, 2012. Seven days later, Line 2 entered revenue service, connecting some of the most populated areas of Hankou, Wuchang, and the Optics Valley.

On April 12, 2013, the NDRC granted acceptance to a feasibility report of Line 8, phase 1, which connects Hankou and Wuchang via the Second Yangtze River Bridge corridor. Construction began in June 2013 and was completed in December 2017.

On 23 January 2020, the entire metro network was shut down, along with all other public transport in the city, including national railway and air travel, in an effort to control the spread of the COVID-19 pandemic in Hubei.

On 28 March 2020, six lines (Line 1, 2, 3, 4, 6, 7) resumed operations, after a two-month lockdown. On 8 April 2020, Line 8 Phase 1 resumed operations. On 22 April 2020, Line 8 Phase 3, Line 11, Yangluo line resumed operations.

Timeline of service expansion

Lines

Line 1

Line 1 is a  elevated urban rail line entirely located in the borough of Hankou. It runs a northwest–southeast route that approximately parallels with Jiefang Avenue for its entire length. There are 27 planned stations, among which 25 are operational. Line 1 operates 33 four-car train sets, 12 of which are manufactured by Changchun Railway Vehicles, and 21 by Zhuzhou Electric Locomotive Co., Ltd.

On July 28, 2004, the first phase of Line 1 began service from Huangpu Road to Zongguan. On July 28, 2010, Line 1 extended from both ends after the completion of phase 2. The phase 3 expansion, which extends the northeast terminus to Hankou North Station, entered revenue service on May 28, 2014. The phase 4 expansion, which extends to Jinghe Station from Dongwu Boulevard. The phase 4 opened on Dec 26th, 2017. Line 1's color is blue.

Line 2

Line 2 is a  underground subway connecting the boroughs of Hankou and Wuchang. Upon completion, Line 2 was the first subway in China to cross the mighty Yangtze River. It runs in a northwest–southeast route and crosses the Yangtze River near Jianghan Road, and Jiyuqiao in Wuchang. Tunnel drilling concluded on February 26, 2012. Revenue service of Line 2 began on December 28, 2012. Line 2 operates 41 six-car train sets, all of which were manufactured by Zhuzhou Electric Locomotive Co., Ltd.

Line 2 was extended towards both directions. The southern extension brought the southeast terminus from Optics Valley Square to Fozuling, and the northwest extension plan brought the northwest terminus from Jinyintan to Tianhe International Airport, providing convenient access for airport and residential areas en route. Early on, construction work on both extensions was expected to commence in 2013, and the tentative completion dates was set at 2015. In May 2014, it was reported that the construction work on the southern extension would start within 2014, with construction completed by February 19, 2019.

Nowadays, Line 2 only have 6 cars, but in the future, it is possible to add 2 more cars to carry more people during rush hours when 6 cars are not enough. Line 2's color is pink.

Line 3

Overall construction of Line 3 was approved by National Development and Reform Commission on Feb 23, 2012, and officially started on Mar 31, 2012. Line 3 went into operation on December 28, 2015. Line 3 cars are Type B and manufactured by CRRC Changchun Railway Vehicles. Line 3's color is dark yellow.

Line 4

Line 4 is mostly underground. It will run in an east–west route serving the Hanyang and Wuchang distincts. The first phase linking Wuchang and Wuhan railway stations opened on December 28, 2013; since that day,  all three main railway stations of Wuhan are connected by the Metro. The second phase of Line 4 will crossing the Yangtze River to Hanyang opened in 2014. Line 4 cars are Type B and manufactured by CRRC Zhuzhou Electric Locomotive. Line 4's color is light green.

Line 5

Line 5  started operation on 26 December 2021. Line 5's color is coral.

Line 6

Line 6 opened in 2016.
And it is the first line of Wuhan Metro to use high capacity A size trains with overhead lines.. Line 6 uses Type A cars manufactured by CRRC Zhuzhou Electric Locomotive. Line 6's color is green.

Line 7

Line 7 is a rapid transit line in Wuhan. The line runs from Garden Expo North in Dongxihu District to Qinglongshan Ditiexiaozhen in Jiangxia District. It serves residential & business areas such as Nanhu, Wuhan CBD and Wuhan Financial street. Line 7 reserves Wuhan Metro's highest capacity rolling stock to date featuring 8 Type-A car train sets accommodating 2480 people, compared to the standard 6 cars found on other lines. It is also the fastest urban line in the system, with trains capable of reaching the speed of 100 km/h (62 mph) compared to 80 km/h (50 mph) on other lines. Line 7's color is orange.

Line 8

Line 8 currently consists of two separate parts. Line 8 Phase 1 was opened in 2017, and Line 8 Phase 3 was opened in 2019. Presently there are 12 stations on the Phase 1 section and 3 on the Phase 3 section. The Phase 2 that is connecting the two parts in 2021. Line 8's color is grey.

Line 11

Line 11 was opened on 1 October 2018 on National Day. Line 11 uses Type A cars manufactured by CRRC Changchun Railway Vehicles. Line 11's color is yellow.

Line 16

Line 16 has a maximum speed of 120 kilometres per hour (75 mph) and has seven underground stations and five elevated stations. The line started operation on 26 December 2021. Line 16's color is fuchsia.

Yangluo Line (Line 21)

The Yangluo Line is a rapid transit line that forms part of the Wuhan Metro system. The line connects the urban area of Hankou and Yangluo, Xinzhou District. Yangluo Line's color is magenta.

Services

Service routes
Short turns are used on Line 2, Line 4, and Line 7, while the other lines only operate the full length of the route. As far as Line 2, Line 4, and Line 7 are concerned, the short turns alternate with the full routes.
Line 2
Short turn: Jinyintan — Wuhandong Railway Station
Full route: Tianhe International Airport — Fozuling
Line 4
Short turn: Yulong Road — Wuhan Railway Station
Full route: Bailin — Wuhan Railway Station
Line 7
Short turn: Julong Blvd — Banqiao
Full route: Hengdian — Qinglongshan Ditiexiaozhen

Opening hours
The operating hours start at 6:00 on weekdays and 6:30 on weekends & holidays. The last trains of Yangluo Line and Line 16 depart from the termini at 22:00 or 22:30, while other lines at 23:00. See the table below for more details.

Ticketing
Fares vary based on the distance travelled.

Discount
Most passagers enter and exit the system using a proximity card called Wuhan Tong, which is available at all metro stations. Passagers who pay metro fare with a Wuhan Tong Card can receive a 10% discount. Besides the metro, Passengers can also pay tram, bus, and ferry fees by Wuhan Tong within Wuhan.

Multi-day pass
There are three kinds of multi-day pass cards valid for one, three, and seven days respectively.
One-day pass: ¥18 each and valid for 1 day;
Three-day pass: ¥45 each and valid for 3 days;
Seven-day pass: ¥90 each and valid for 7 days.
Cardholders may enjoy one, three, or seven days of unlimited rides in the metro system. The multi-day pass cards are available at the Customer Service Centres in the metro stations. In addition, a RMB 20 deposit is charged for each multi-day pass card.

Amenities

4G LTE services are provided in all stations and trains. As Line 1 was put into operation earlier, it lacks in some facilities. For more amenity information, please see the table below. It is worth mentioning that most of the restrooms are set outside the paid area.

Food ban
Wuhan was the first city on the Chinese mainland to ban food and drinks on the subway on December 28, 2013, dishing out fines of up to RMB200. On 1 April 2020, a nationwide food ban was enacted, which also includes conduct rules cracking down on bad subway etiquette, such as stepping on seats, lying down on a bench or floor and playing music or videos out loud.

Rolling stock

Signalling
Wuhan Metro Line 1 is the first one equipped with moving block system in China. All the lines are equipped with CBTC. A fully automated, driverless train system (GoA4), provided by Traffic Control Technology Corporation Limited, has been applied to Line 5 since .

Ridership

Since 2012, the ridership of the entire network has grown as the new lines or sections come into operation every year. The following data were released by the Wuhan Statistics Bureau, however, the data before 2007 are unavailable. The sudden drop in ridership in 2020 was due to the COVID-19 Pandemic in China, with Hubei, and Wuhan specifically being the worst affected area in China.

Future expansion

A number of lines are under construction. Line 12 will be a loop line. Line 9, 10, as well as Line 13, are being planned by the municipal authority.

Stations

Almost all stations, except the stations on Line 1, are equipped with platform screen doors. There is a plan that stations on Line 1 will be equipped with platform screen doors in the future. The metro stations are equipped to be disabled and elderly friendly, with automatic fare collection system, announcement system, electronic display boards, escalators and lifts. The stations are equipped with non-slippery flooring with grip-rails, audio announcements and Braille facilities to help visually challenged passengers.

Gallery

Network Map

See also
Wuhan Metro rolling stock
List of Wuhan Metro stations
Trams in Wuhan
Wuhan Metro Museum
List of metro systems
Urban rail transit in China

Notes

References

External links

Official site 
UrbanRail.net's page on the Wuhan Metro

 
Rapid transit in China
Underground rapid transit in China
Railway lines opened in 2004
2004 establishments in China
Projects established in 1979